Beatriz Azurduy-Palacios (b 1952 in Bolivia - July 20, 2003 in Havana, Cuba) was a Bolivian motion picture director.  She was married and worked with Jorge Sanjinés for over 28 years.

Biography
Among the works she contributed to, either as producer, editor or screenwriter, were ¡Fuera de aquí!, Banderas del amanecer, La nación clandestina y Para recibir el canto de los pájaros. She was a member of the board of directors of the Fundación del Nuevo Cine Latinoamericano. She represented Bolivia at the International School of Cinema and Television of San Antonio de los Baños and was also a member of the Film Directors of Latin America Committee. In 1999, during the XXIst International Festival of the New Latin American Cinema, held in Havana, she received the recognition of the Union of Writers and Artists of Cuba for her significant contribution.

She maintained, to the margin of her cinematographic activities, a constant "shared in common" attitude with the Cuban Revolution and died in that country, where she had traveled to receive medical attention.  She is buried in Colon Cemetery, Havana, Cuba.

References
 
 https://www.findagrave.com/memorial/7705627
 https://web.archive.org/web/20120206215853/http://www.granma.cu/espanol/2003/julio/mier23/beatriz.html 

Bolivian expatriates in Cuba
Bolivian women film directors
Bolivian film editors
Bolivian film producers
Bolivian screenwriters
1952 births
2003 deaths
Bolivian women writers
Women film editors
20th-century screenwriters